Ablepharus budaki, commonly known as Budak's skink and Budak's snake-eyed skink, is a species of lizard in the family Scincidae. The species is endemic to the Near East.

Taxonomy
A. budaki is a scincid saurian vertebrate. In 1997, it was promoted from its status as a subspecies of Ablepharus kitaibelii to full species status.

Etymology
The specific name, budaki, is in honor of Turkish herpetologist .

Geographic range
A. budaki occurs in southern Turkey, western Syria, Cyprus, and Lebanon.

Habitat
The preferred habitat of A. budaki is leaf litter of shrubby or forested areas.

Reproduction
A. budaki is oviparous.

Conservation status
A. budaki is common and has no major threats in most of its range, though in Lebanon it may face a threat from deforestation.

References

Further reading
Göçmen B, Kumlutaş Y, Tosunoglu M (1996). "A new subspecies, Ablepharus kitaibelii (Bibron & Borry, 1833) budaki n. ssp. (Sauria: Scincidae) from the Turkish Republic of Northern Cyprus". Turkish Journal of Zoology 20: 397–405. (Ablepharus kitaibelii budaki, new subspecies).
Poulakakis N, Lymberakis P, Tsigenopoulos CS, Magoulas A, Mylonas M (2005). "Phylogenetic relationships and evolutionary history of snake-eyed skink Ablepharus kitaibelii (Sauria: Scincidae)". Molecular Phylogenetics and Evolution 34 (2): 245–256.
Schmidtler JF (1997). "Die Ablepharus kitaibelii - Gruppe in Süd-Anatolien und benachbarten Gebieten (Squamata: Sauria: Scinidae)". Herpetozoa 10 (1/2): 35–63. (Ablepharus budaki, new status). (in German).
Sindaco R, Jeremčenko VK (2008). The Reptiles of the Western Palearctic. 1. Annotated Checklist and Distributional Atlas of the Turtles, Crocodiles, Amphisbaenians and Lizards of Europe, North Africa, Middle East and Central Asia. (Monographs of the Societas Herpetologica Italica). Latina, Italy: Edizioni Belvedere. 580 pp. .

Ablepharus
Reptiles described in 1996
Lizards of Asia